The 1995 Mid-Continent Conference Tournament took place from May 20 through 23. The top two regular season finishers of each of the league's two divisions met in the double-elimination tournament held at Monier Field on the campus of Eastern Illinois University in Charleston, Illinois.  won the tournament for the first time.

Format and seeding
The top two teams from each division advanced to the tournament.

Tournament

Game-by-game results

All-Tournament Team

Tournament Most Valuable Player
Jason Fawcett of Troy State was named Tournament MVP.

References

Tournament
Summit League Baseball Tournament
Mid-Continent Conference baseball tournament
Mid-Continent Conference baseball tournament